The Cyprus Scouts Association (SPK) is the national Scouting organization of Cyprus. It was founded in 1913 and became a member of the World Organization of the Scout Movement in 1961. SPK has 5,926 members.

History
Scouting was officially founded in Cyprus in 1913 by N. K. Lanitis and Nikos Nikolaides, with the assistance of the United Kingdom. 

In 1980, Savvas Kokkinides was awarded the Bronze Wolf, the only distinction of the World Organization of the Scout Movement, awarded by the World Scout Committee for exceptional services to world Scouting.

Program and ideals
The Cyprus Scouts Association is open to all boys and girls including those stationed at the Eastern and Western Sovereign Base Areas. The Scouts are one of the oldest youth organizations on the island. Scouts have taken an active part in all aspects of social and cultural life.

The Cyprus Scout Association takes an active part in national, regional and international Scout events. Cyprus was represented at the 19th World Jamboree in Chile by 36 Scouts and was also represented in the 21st World Scout Jamboree that took place in the UK.

The Scouts of Cyprus have been working to assist with the refugee crisis caused by the 2006 Lebanon War. One of the Scout Centers is accommodating 106 children from Lebanon who had been separated from their families while fleeing the war-torn country. As the situation escalates, thousands of people are now arriving daily by sea at the ports of Larnaca and Limassol.
The Scout Motto (Προσκοπικό ρητό) is Έσo έτοιμος, Be Prepared in Greek.

The membership badge of the Cyprus Scouts Association incorporates the copper-yellow and green national colors, as well as the olive branches of the coat of arms and the flag of Cyprus.

Scout Oath

Scout Law

References

External links
Official Homepage of the Cyprus Scouts Association

Youth organizations established in 1913
World Organization of the Scout Movement member organizations
Scouting and Guiding in Cyprus
1913 establishments in Cyprus